Loeflingia is a genus of plant in the family Caryophyllaceae occurring in North America, Europe, northern Africa, and southwestern Asia. Plants of the genus bear bristle-like stipules, as well as axillary, sessile flowers with awned sepals and no or vestigial petals. The fruit is a three-valved capsule.

Species

Species include the following:
 Loeflingia baetica Lag.	
 Loeflingia hispanica L.	
 Loeflingia squarrosa Nutt.	
 Loeflingia tavaresiana Samp.

External links
Loeflingia at The Plant List
Loeflingia at Calflora.org

Caryophyllaceae genera
Caryophyllaceae